Bandy Federation of India (BFI) is the governing body of bandy in India. It is headquartered in Mandi. The Bandy Federation of India was established in 2001 and became a member of the Federation of International Bandy the year after.  

Bandy is generally played in northern India where there is usually snow and ice. India is one of seven Asian countries to be a member of the Federation of International Bandy. The Bandy Federation of India administers bandy in India. The international debut of India national bandy team was set to take place at the 2011 Asian Winter Games, but they didn't come. Then they were supposed to play in the first Asian Bandy Championships to be held in Almaty in December 2012, a tournament which ultimately did not take place.

References

External links
 India at Federation of International Bandy

Bandy in India
Bandy
Sports organizations established in 2001
Sport in Himachal Pradesh
Mandi, Himachal Pradesh
2001 establishments in Himachal Pradesh
Federation of International Bandy members
India